A geoportal is a type of web portal used to find and access geographic information (geospatial information) and associated geographic services (display, editing, analysis, etc.) via the Internet.  Geoportals are important for effective use of geographic information systems (GIS) and a key element of a spatial data infrastructure (SDI).

Geographic information providers, including government agencies and commercial sources, use geoportals to publish descriptions (geospatial metadata) of their geographic information.  Geographic information consumers, professional or casual, use geoportals to search and access the information they need.  Thus geoportals serve an increasingly important role in the sharing of geographic information and can avoid duplicated efforts, inconsistencies, delays, confusion, and wasted resources.

Background
The U.S. National Spatial Data Infrastructure (NSDI), started in 1994 (see OMB Circular A-16), is considered the earliest geoportal concept.  The U.S. Federal Geospatial Data Committee (FGDC) coordinated development of the Federal Geographic Data Clearinghouse (or NSDI Clearinghouse Network), the first large geoportal.  It has many distributed catalogs that can be searched via a client interface.

First released in 2003, the Geospatial One-Stop (GOS) geoportal was developed as part of a U.S. e-government initiative.  Unlike the NSDI Clearinghouse Network, GOS was built around a centralized metadata catalog database, with an architecture that links users to data providers through a Web-based geoportal.  The user of GOS may employ a simple Web browser (thin client) or may interface directly with a GIS (thick client).

More recently, there has been a proliferation of geoportals for sharing of geographic information based on region or theme.  Examples include the INSPIRE geoportal (Infrastructure for Spatial Information in the European Community, established in 2007), the NatCarb geoportal, which provides geographic information concerning carbon sequestration in the United States, and UNSDI, the United Nations Spatial Data Infrastructure.

Modern web-based geoportals include direct access to raw data in multiple formats, complete metadata, online visualization tools so users can create maps with data in the portal, automated provenance linkages across users, datasets and created maps, commenting mechanisms to discuss data quality and interpretation, and sharing or exporting created maps in various formats. Open portals allow user contribution of datasets as well.

In September 2011, GOS was retired and the content it included by then became part of the broader open data site (Geo.)Data.gov. At the same time, the United States federal government launched the Geospatial Platform, which represents a shift from focusing on cataloging references to resources, to providing shared web services for national significant datasets, API for developers, and end-user applications (built on those web services and API).

See also 
 Georeference
 List of GIS data sources
 National Mapping Agency#List of national mapping agencies
 Spatial Data Infrastructure

References

Sources
 Fu, P., and J. Sun. 2010. Web GIS: Principles and Applications. ESRI Press. Redlands, CA. .
 Goodchild, M.F., P. Fu, and P.M. Rich.  2007.  Geographic information sharing: the case of the Geospatial One-Stop portal.  Annals of the Association of American Geographers 97(2):250-266.
 Maguire, D.J., and P.A. Longley.  2005.  The emergence of geoportals and their role in spatial data infrastructures.  Computers, Environment and Urban Systems 29: 3-14.
 Tang, W. and Selwood, J.  2005.  Spatial Portals: Gateways to Spatial Information.  ESRI Press, Redlands, CA.

Geographic data and information
Web portals